The Intercourse is an arts center in Red Hook, Brooklyn, New York, U.S.A., founded by contemporary artist Dustin Yellin in 2012. The center includes a large scale exhibition space, a garden and sculpture park, an artist-in-residency program, a class and lecture series. The Intercourse opened to the public in June 2012 with Adam Green's show Cartoon and Complaint.

The building
The Intercourse is housed in a brick building that dates back to the time of the American Civil War. The space was originally a part of the complex of Pioneer Iron Works and is a remnant of Red Hook's booming industrial past. At the time the Iron Works occupied nearly the entire block between Van Brunt and Conover streets. Dustin Yellin purchased the 24,000 square foot building in June 2011 and began renovations soon after.

The Intercourse Project
The Intercourse is focused on supporting and encouraging creative thought through the development, sharing and combining of ideas and collective knowledge. This goal is accomplished through hosting artist-in-resident studios, classes, lectures, a self-published magazine and rotating exhibitions in the main space and sculpture garden. The Intercourse Project is currently collaborating with Recess Activities and is acting as a host space for Recess' program Session. The first edition of Intercourse Magazine is available now. It features contributions from Gibby Haynes, Andrew VanWyngarden, Bob Colacello, and others

References

Arts centers in New York City
Red Hook, Brooklyn
Event venues established in 2012
2012 establishments in New York City